The 2007 European Junior Judo Championships is an edition of the European Junior Judo Championships, organised by the International Judo Federation. It was held in Prague, Czech Republic from 5 to 7 October 2007.

Medal summary

Medal table

Men's events

Women's events

Source Results

References

External links
 

 U21
European Junior Judo Championships
European Championships, U18
Judo
Judo in the Czech Republic
Judo
Judo, European Championships U18